Ash or ashes are the solid remnants of fires. Specifically, ash refers to all non-aqueous, non-gaseous residues that remain after something burns. In analytical chemistry, to analyse the mineral and metal content of chemical samples,  ash is the non-gaseous, non-liquid residue after complete combustion.

Ashes as the end product of incomplete combustion are mostly mineral, but usually still contain an amount of combustible organic or other oxidizable residues. The best-known type of ash is wood ash, as a product of wood combustion in campfires, fireplaces, etc. The darker the wood ashes, the higher the content of remaining charcoal from incomplete combustion. The ashes are of different types. Some ashes contain natural compounds that make soil fertile. Others have chemical compounds that can be toxic but may break up in soil from chemical changes and microorganism activity.

Like soap, ash is also a disinfecting agent (alkaline). The World Health Organization recommends ash or sand as alternative when soap is not available.

The English word ash is derived from the Biblical Hebrew word for fire, אש (esh/aysh).

Natural occurrence
Ash occurs naturally from any fire that burns vegetation, and may disperse in the soil to fertilise it, or clump under it for long enough to carbonise into coal.

Specific types
 Wood ash
 Products of coal combustion
 Bottom ash
 Fly ash
 Cigarette or cigar ash
 Incinerator bottom ash, a form of ash produced in incinerators
 Ashes and dried bone fragments, or "cremains", left from cremation
 Volcanic ash, ash that consists of fragmented glass, rock, and minerals that appears during an eruption.

See also
 Ash (analytical chemistry)
 Cinereous, consisting of ashes, ash-colored or ash-like
 Potash, a term for many useful potassium salts that traditionally derived from plant ashes, but today are typically mined from underground deposits
 coal, consisting of carbon as ash, and ash can be converted into coal
 carbon, basic component of ashes

References

Combustion